Funzie Girt ("Finns' dyke") is an ancient dividing wall that was erected from north to south across the island of Fetlar in Shetland. Some sources describe it as having been built in the Neolithic,  but the date of construction is not certainly known. Also known as the Finnigirt Dyke, it has vanished in places at the southern end, although the ruins are clearly visible along much of the uninhabited north of the island, where it is a conspicuous feature of the landscape. The dyke's original purpose is not known, nor is its relationship to other archaeological sites of a similar age nearby. There are various folk tales about its construction, and it is the subject of various pieces of Shetland folk music.

Etymology 
The name "Funzie Girt" means "Finns' dyke", the Finns being the legendary pre-Norse inhabitants of the islands who were said to possess magical powers. (The later Iron Age inhabitants of the Northern Isles were actually Pictish, although the historical record is fairly sparse.) The variation between Finn and Funzie is due to widespread confusion of the letter ȝ (yogh) with the cursive form of the letter z. An earlier name for the dyke was simply "Finnigord" and Finnigirt dyke  is  thus tautologous as gord already means "dyke".

The dyke could have had a role in the naming of Fetlar itself. The division of the island by the dyke was so marked that the Norse seemed to treat Fetlar as two distinct islands—which they called "Est Isle" and "Wast Isle". Haswell-Smith (2004) suggests that the derivation of the name is from fetill, the Old Norse for a "strap" or a "tie", and that Fetlar could therefore  mean "two islands tied together" by the dyke.  Gammeltoft (2010) however, argues that fetlar actually means "shoulder-straps", that this description is hardly an obvious one for an island name and Fetlar is thus most probably a Norse adaptation of a precursor language.  This was probably the Pictish language although there is no unequivocal evidence for this.

Geography 
It reappears at the southern shore of Skutes Water, and is particularly well-preserved between Riggin of Setter  and Rivs Dale, but its line is then lost again as it skirts the settlement of Houbie. It may have crossed an area known as Vallahamars by the ruins of a later broch reaching the south coast of Fetlar near Stack of Billaclett, although local tradition asserts that it ended at the edge of the cliffs of Clemmels Geos. The total length would therefore originally have been  or more.

Whilsa Pund is constructed using a similar technique and was probably built at a similar time to Funzie Girt.

There are various other prehistoric ruins near the line of the wall, including the Bronze Age Hjaltadans stone circle north of Skutes Water, which is only  from the dyke, and the three stone circles of Fiddler's Crus to the north-west. There are also two Neolithic heel-shaped cairns, a style of chambered cairn unique to Shetland, near the summit of Vord Hill.

Construction 

The date of construction is unknown. Haswell-Smith (2004) speculatively implies a Mesolithic provenance and a Bronze Age date has also been mentioned although the Neolithic is quoted by some authoritative sources. However the distinction between the Neolithic and Bronze Ages is not especially marked in Shetland and a date prior to the 1st millennium BC is likely.

There are numerous old boundary dykes in Shetland and Funzie Girt is considered to be the best surviving example. It both divides the island west to east and also marks an upland/lower land boundary, with the higher slopes of Vord Hill to the east of the dyke. It is constructed from local stones with the largest slabs and boulders placed either on end or on edge and forming the base.  The human effort required would have been considerable and suggests a relatively high Neolithic population for Shetland—perhaps as much as 10,000. Although most likely built as a territorial boundary of some kind, the original purpose of the dyke is not certain. In historic times it acted as a boundary marker or hagri, but its huge scale is difficult to reconcile with the available prehistoric human resources. It has been described as a "Bronze Age Berlin Wall", which may have separated two competing tribes.

Even when they had stone bases these dykes needed regular maintenance and in historic times were often mounted with fences to make them stock-proof.

History and scheduling 
Fetlar was surveyed in 1850, at which time part of the Funzie Girt formed the east end of one of the important "marches" or property boundaries for Russeter, west of Colbinstoft on north Fetlar. At that time the oldest man on the island, one Andrew Johnson, claimed to have been on the last "riding" of the bounds in 1820.

The northern, and most complete section of Funzie Girt has been protected as a scheduled monument since December 1957. The notification to Sir Harold Stanley Nicolson of Brough Lodge, Fetlar states that the protected area is "2000 yards or thereby" (i.e. about 1,828 metres) in extent. The text provides a detailed description and the associated map  indicates the line of the wall. No land on either side is included. The scheduled area is however contiguous with that of the "irregular polygon" surrounding Whilsa Pund that received similar protection in 1998.

Folklore and music 
A large rock known as "the Haljer o' Fivlagord" lies near the south end of the dyke. Fivl means "Troll", suggesting that there was a belief at one time that the dyke had been constructed by these mythical creatures. Trolls were also supposed to inhabit a nearby cave on the coast. A local story concerns the farm at Colbinstoft(Kólbein) to the west of the dyke on the north coast of Fetlar. The farmer desired a boundary fence for his property and promised that if one appeared during the night he would give up his best cow to the Finns. The next morning the dyke had appeared but the cow was gone. There is also a tradition that it was constructed as a result of a disagreement between two landowners.

Hjaltadans means "limping dance" and local folklore has it that a fiddler and his wife were dancing at night with trolls. They failed to notice the dawn and were all petrified in place when the sun rose, so turning the trolls into the circle of stones, with the two recumbent stones at the centre being the resting place of the humans.

Debbie Scott, a fiddle player from Papa Stour recorded the song "Da Hill o' Finnigirt – Da Burn o' Finnigirt" on her 1985 album The Selkie's Song which features guitarist Peerie Willie Johnson. There is also a fiddle tune called the "Muckle Reel O' Finnigirt", which accompanied a dance whose steps have now been lost, although it is known that it was played as a break from the more strenuous reels.

See also 
 Biruaslum

References 

Notes

Footnotes

General references
 Fenton, Alexander (1997) The Northern Isles: Orkney and Shetland. Dundurn Press.
 Gammeltoft, Peder (2010) "Shetland and Orkney Island-Names – A Dynamic Group". Northern Lights, Northern Words. Selected Papers from the FRLSU Conference, Kirkwall 2009, edited by Robert McColl Millar.
 
 Hunter, James (2000) Last of the Free: A History of the Highlands and Islands of Scotland. Edinburgh. Mainstream. 
Jakobsen, Jakob (1897) The Dialect and Place Names of Shetland. T. & J. Manson. Published on-line by Archive.org. Retrieved 15 May 2011.
 Schei, Liv Kjørsvik (2006) The Shetland Isles. Grantown-on-Spey. Colin Baxter Photography. 
 Turner, Val (1998) Ancient Shetland. London. B. T. Batsford/Historic Scotland.

External links 
 Black-and-white image of the dyke by RCAHMS

2nd-millennium BC architecture in Scotland
Buildings and structures in Shetland
Archaeological sites in Shetland
History of Shetland
Scheduled monuments in Scotland
Stone Age sites in Scotland
Neolithic Scotland
Walls in Scotland
Fetlar
Ancient dikes